Ensina sonchi  is a species of fly in the family Tephritidae , the gall flies. It is found in the  Palearctic . The larvae feed on the flower heads of Asteraceae (Chondrilla juncea, Cirsium arvense, Cirsium vulgare, Hieracium umbellatum, Hypochaeris radicata  Sonchus arvensis , Taraxacum officinale ....).

Distribution
United Kingdom & Scandinavia South to North Africa, East to Japan; introduced to Ethiopia, Taiwan, Philippines, Hawaii.

References

External links
Bladmineerders.

Tephritinae
Insects described in 1767
Taxa named by Carl Linnaeus
Diptera of Asia
Diptera of Africa
Diptera of Europe